The 1991 Abia State gubernatorial election occurred on December 14, 1991. NRC candidate Ogbonnaya Onu won the election.

Conduct
The gubernatorial election was conducted using an open ballot system. Primaries for the two parties to select their flag bearers were conducted on October 19, 1991.

The election occurred on December 14, 1991. NRC candidate Ogbonnaya Onu won the election.

References 

Gubernatorial election 1991
December 1991 events in Nigeria
Abia